Anand Kumar (born 1973) is an Indian mathematician.

Anand Kumar may  also refer to:
Anand Kumar (director) (born 1970), Indian film director
Anand Kumar (sociologist) (born 1950), Indian sociologist and politician
Anand Kumar (IAS officer), Indian bureaucrat

See also
Ananth Kumar (disambiguation)